Hanle Monastery is a 17th-century gompa of the Drukpa Lineage of the Kagyu school of Tibetan Buddhism located in the Hanle Valley, Leh district, Ladakh, India on an old branch of the ancient Ladakh-Tibet trade route. The valley is home to about a thousand people, with about 300 people living in Hanle village. The monastery is home to about ten monks while another 33 or so come regularly for prayers. It is only  from the disputed frontier between India and Chinese-controlled Tibet.

The main monastery, one of the largest and best known of Ladakh's monasteries, was built under the patronage of the Ladakhi king Sengge Namgyal (r. c. 1616-1642 CE) with the assistance of the famous Tibetan lama and traveler Taktsang Répa Ngakwang Gyatso. It was the first to be associated with the Drukpa Lineage and which, under the patronage of the Namgyal family, became very important in Ladakh, functioning as a serious rival to the reformed Gelug school. The monasteries in Hanle, Hemis, Chemrey and Stakna all belong to the Drukpa school.

Sengge Namgyal died at Hanle on his return from an expedition against the Mongols, who had occupied Tsang and were threatening Ladakh.

Outside donations established the Tashi Choeling ("Auspicious Dharma Centre") in 1983 providing support for resident nuns (who numbered 47 in 2003). In a January, 2004 article it is said to have had only 10 resident monks with 33 coming regularly for prayers.

It is also home to the Indian Astronomical Observatory. The location of both the village and the observatory are highly sensitive due to the close proximity of the Tibetan / Chinese border and special permission is needed to visit either by the government of India.

Footnotes

References
 Lang, Karen E. and photos by Mattias Klum. "In their own world: The sacred community of India's forbidden Hanle Valley." National Geographic Magazine. January 2004, pp. 88–99.
 Rizvi, Janet (1996). Ladakh: Crossroads of High Asia. Second Edition. (1996). Oxford University Press, New Delhi. .

Buddhist monasteries in Ladakh
Drukpa Kagyu monasteries and temples